The 1915 Akron football team represented the University of Akron, formerly Buchtel College, in the 1915 college football season. The team was led by head coach Fred Sefton, in his first season. Akron was outscored by their opponents by a total of 20–239. This season was the team's first as part of a conference, the Ohio Athletic Conference.

Schedule

References

Akron
Akron Zips football seasons
Akron football